Saint-Pierre-de-Chartreuse is a commune in the Isère department in the Auvergne-Rhône-Alpes region in southeastern France.

It is located in the Chartreuse Mountains, to the north of the city of Grenoble. The Grande Chartreuse, the head monastery of the Carthusian order is located in Saint-Pierre-de-Chartreuse.

Geography
The town is located in the heart of the Chartreuse Mountains 25 kilometers north of Grenoble.

Etymology

The town was earlier known as Catorissium, Cantourisa, Caturissium, and Chatrousse. The name is of Gaulish origin; and is perhaps related to the name of the Caturiges tribe.

History
The town is mentioned in the Tabula Peutingeriana under the name Catorissium, and in the Ravenna Cosmography as Cantourisa.

When St. Bruno and his six companions settled near Chartrousse in June 1084 on the indication of Bishop Hugues de Grenoble, they took the name of the nearby village, and Latinized it in Cartusia.

Population

Media
 Local television : France 3 Alpes 
 Local radio stations: Radio Couleur Chartreuse

Economy

Early twentieth century
Saint-Pierre-de-Chartreuse has lived of agriculture for a long time, like all mountain townships, and also of the wood trade, the forest being composed primarily of conifers. In the early twentieth century, tourism took an important place, including the construction of the 'Grand Som' high-end hotel that hosted famous guests including Queen Victoria of the United Kingdom for example.

The village was rated weather resort in the 1930s and people came here to recharge, visit the monastery of the Grande Chartreuse (which was open to the public between 1903, date of the expulsion of the monks, until 1940 date of their return from Italy).

It was also at St. Pierre that created first "Syndicat d'initiative" of France, now best known under the name "Office du Tourisme" (tourist information center); and thanks to an Alsatian called Leon Auscher, who had adopted this country that was so dear to him.

Between the wars, many families in the village engage in the hotel, the number of travelers grows. During this period, the first lift was born, in the form of a sleigh pulled by a winch. Then the 1950s drove to the installation of the first teleported: the "télébenne".

Since 1970
The ski resort experienced the glory days of winter sports in the 1970s and after suffering "years without snow" in the 1980s and early 1990s, it is currently experiencing a second wind. While snow is sometimes random  it doesn't allows higher seasons more than three months, but its strategic location near major urban centers (including Grenoble), the approximation of the neighboring station Planolet, the family atmosphere and affordable prices made that it experienced in 2005 and 2006 its largest turnover in terms of selling packages.

Winter sports (mainly alpine skiing but Nordic skiing or snowshoeing) relate to the heart of the township the massive 90 million euros per year and are make a work-life to a large number of Chartroussins.

Crafts are not left out, and the village is home to masons, stonecutters, carpenters, and all corporations of the building ...

Tourism remains one of the very solid players of the Chartreuse Massif and the township. Many visitors come to discover the Grande Chartreuse monastery founded by St. Bruno in 1084 and especially the Museum of the Grande Chartreuse at the Correrie dedicated to it: 60,000 visitors / year.

The shops are also present: bakery, butchery, supermarket, pharmacy, newsagent, cheese, bars, hotels, restaurants, sports shops, salon.

Personalities
 The painter Arcabas realized paintings that are in the church of Saint-Hugues-de-Chartreuse, the second hamlet in the township.
 Guy Lafond, son of the former mayor and brother of former motorcycle champion who is woodcarver ; 
 Jacques Brel lived in Saint-Pierre-de-Chartreuse. You can see his house on the edges of the ski slopes. In tribute to the great singer, a festival of French musicians called "Les rencontres Brel" (Brel meetings) takes place every summer in a large tent erected in the middle of the central square. 
 Paul Touvier was employed as a secretary by the monastery of the Grande Chartreuse in 1972 under the name of Paul Berthet (that was the name of his wife). It was under this name that the inhabitants of the village, including former resistant, knew him as well as Jacques Brel, whose he was the impresario.
 Raoul Billioti (1828-1882), MP for Vaucluse.
 Alain Longet, sculptor, Meilleur Ouvrier de France is linked to the town by his participation in the competition for three years on Wood challenge at St Pierre at Brel meetings. This artist has exhibited permanently in the United States, the Grand Palais in Paris, and Elysee Palace. He is the creator and VIVARTS ARTMETAL .

Events
 Race ski mountaineering "The Cross Chamechaude "in early March; 
 Mountain trail, Le Grand Duc, race taking place the last weekend of June or first of July, sponsored by the company Raidlight located in the town; 
 The eco-festival of French songs "The Brel meeting" takes place every year in mid-July; 
 An international sculpture competition existed, it was in conjunction with the meetings Brel ; 
 A film festival of sculpture, Images sculpture exists since 2004 In 2006, in May and June, Cornelia Konrads, a German artist in residence, created a work in situ, near the river, in the village.; 
 In 2007, the sculptor Jean-Michel Moreau made an ephemeral work in sand, Fractal II, in the huge barn located inside the Grande Chartreuse museum. On the site of the event, you can watch a film about the realization of the sand sculpture . 
 "The battle of Eringer cows" takes place every year on the first Sunday of August. Farmers present their Eringer cows. They compete in a free and fair fights. After a fierce and natural fight, will be elected "Queen of Hérens de Chartreuse"; 
 In mid-September instead Heritage Days with a special program for youth at the Museum of the Grande Chartreuse.

Sports

Ski
The Saint Pierre de Chartreuse / Le Planolet ski resorts include : 
35 km of slopes, 4 black, 9 red, 5 blue and 6 green. 14 lifts, 1 gondola, 3 chairlifts and 10 Lifts.
The top of the resort is located at La Scia at 1791 m altitude. The bottom of the station is situated 900 m, this is a drop of almost 900 m.

Depending on snow conditions, the resort features a snowpark (located on the old departure of the chairlift Battour), and various spots on the Scia (Big Air in the first ledge and various bumps on the last run of the track).

You can access the station in three places. St Pierre de Chartreuse village, Combe de l'ourse chairlift parking, or Le planolet. on weekdays outside of school holidays, often combe de l'ourse is closed.

Trail-Running
The area surrounding St Pierre de Chartreuse is becoming increasingly popular as a trail-running destination, with several marked trails of varying length and difficulty.  The ultra-running race "Le Grand Duc" (named after the Eagle Owl which is the symbol of the Parc Régional Naturel de Chartreuse) starts and ends in the village with a route which varies each edition.

Sights
 The Musée de la Grande Chartreuse, just 2 km from the famous monastery founded by St. Bruno this unique site to better understand the mystery of the Carthusian Order, their 900-year history, lifestyle, cut off from the world and locked in the silence ... Resolutely modern, the museum housed in a former dependency of Carthusian monks, opens the door to their spiritual journey and invites you to discover the "Great Silence".
 The church of Saint-Hugues-de-Chartreuse, St. Hugues, unique because it houses the Museum of contemporary sacred art which exposes 111 works by the painter Arcabas.
 At the limits of the territory of the district on the west side, the forest house of the Col de la Charmette is a typical forest architecture of the nineteenth century The construction of this imposing building dates back to 1862. According to historical periods, the activity of the lodge was linked either to logging or tourism. The Office National des Fôrets (National Forestry Office) has decided to sell the building in 2010. A partnership was formed so that this place can continue to be open to the public.

See also
Communes of the Isère department

References

External links
 Official site

Communes of Isère